Lamprobacter is a Gram-negative, rod-shaped and motile genus of bacteria from the family of Chromatiaceae with one known species (Lamprobacter modestohalophilus). The habitat of Lamprobacter bacteria is hydrogen sulfide-containing mud and saline water.

References

Further reading 
 

Chromatiales
Bacteria genera
Monotypic bacteria genera
Taxa described in 1988